Fanie is a South African male given name. Notable people with this name include:

 Fanie Eloff (1885-1947)
 Fanie Lombaard (born 1969), South African athlete
 Fanie de Jager (born 1949), South African operatic tenor
 Fanie de Villiers (born 1964), South African cricket player
 Fanie du Plessis (1930–2001), South African discus thrower and shot putter
 Fanie du Toit, South African politician
 Fanie van der Merwe (born 1986), South African athlete